These are the official results of the Women's 800 metres event at the 1993 IAAF World Championships in Stuttgart, Germany. There were a total number of 37 participating athletes, with five qualifying heats and the final held on Tuesday 1993-08-17.

Doping disqualification
Liliya Nurutdinova (Russia) had originally placed seventh, but was disqualified after testing positive for the anabolic steroid stanozolol.

Final

Semifinals
Held on Sunday 1993-08-15

Qualifying heats
Held on Saturday 1993-08-14

See also
 1990 Women's European Championships 800 metres (Split)
 1991 Women's World Championships 800 metres (Tokyo)
 1992 Women's Olympic 800 metres (Barcelona)
 1994 Women's European Championships 800 metres (Helsinki)
 1995 Women's World Championships 800 metres (Gothenburg)
 1996 Women's Olympic 800 metres (Atlanta)

References

 Results

 
800 metres at the World Athletics Championships
1993 in women's athletics